Han-devant-Pierrepont (literally Han before Pierrepont) is a commune in the Meurthe-et-Moselle department in north-eastern France. Before 1997, it was part of the Meuse department.

See also
Communes of the Meurthe-et-Moselle department

References

Handevantpierrepont